{{safesubst:#invoke:RfD|||month = March
|day = 17
|year = 2023
|time = 02:05
|timestamp = 20230317020529

|content=
REDIRECT Flatulence

}}